Sergei Ivanovich Podpaly (born 13 September 1963) is a Russian association football coach and former player. He works as a director of sports for FC Arsenal Tula.

Honours
 Russian Premier League bronze: 1994.
 Russian Cup winner: 1995.

International career
Podpaly made his debut for Russia on 16 August 1992 in a friendly against Mexico. That was the first game Russia played under its name after the breakup of the Soviet Union.

Coaching career
On 1 July 2020, he was appointed caretaker manager of Russian Premier League club FC Arsenal Tula. On 31 July 2020, he signed a contract to manage Arsenal for the 2020–21 season. He was dismissed by Arsenal on 2 November 2020.

References

External links
 Profile 
 

1963 births
Living people
Soviet footballers
Russian footballers
Association football defenders
Russia international footballers
Russian expatriate footballers
Expatriate footballers in Israel
Russian expatriate sportspeople in Israel
Expatriate footballers in Belarus
Russian expatriate sportspeople in Belarus
Russian Premier League players
FC Dynamo Kirov players
FC Tyumen players
FC Zenit Saint Petersburg players
FC Shakhtar Donetsk players
FC Lokomotiv Moscow players
Hapoel Haifa F.C. players
FC Dynamo Moscow players
FC Dynamo Stavropol players
FC Moscow players
FC Lokomotiv Nizhny Novgorod players
FC Gomel players
Russian people of Ukrainian descent
Russian football managers
Russian expatriate football managers
Expatriate football managers in Belarus
Expatriate football managers in Latvia
Russian expatriate sportspeople in Latvia
FC Gomel managers
FC Torpedo Minsk managers
FC Tyumen managers
FK Ventspils managers
FC Mordovia Saransk managers
FC Arsenal Tula managers
Russian Premier League managers